The castra of Ploiești was a Roman fort built in the 2nd century AD. It was abandoned in the same century. Its ruins were unearthed in Ploiești (Romania). Currently, no remains are visible due to the area occupied by the castrum now being a residential area. However, some earthwork-like features can be seen in the uneven surfaces of the roads in the area ("bumps"), and a clearly visible terrace can be observed overlooking the Dâmbu brook (once having a high flow rate, but nowadays reduced to a brook from a river), adjacent to the site.

See also
List of castra

Notes

External links
Roman castra from Romania - Google Maps / Earth

Roman legionary fortresses in Romania
History of Muntenia
Historic monuments in Prahova County
Ploiești